Mian Hanziran (also Romanized as Mīān Hanzīrān) is a village in Gafr and Parmon Rural District, Gafr and Parmon District, Bashagard County, Hormozgan Province, Iran. At the 2006 census, its population was 86, in 25 families.

References 

Populated places in Bashagard County